John Sedwick (July 13, 1927 - July 3, 2008)  was a television director and actor.

Credits
 Search For Tomorrow
 One Life to Live
 Dark Shadows
 The Bold and the Beautiful
 The Edge of Night
 Santa Barbara (hired by The Dobsons)

Awards and nominations
He was nominated for 5 Daytime Emmy Awards.

External links

American television directors
2008 deaths
1927 births
Place of birth missing
Place of death missing